The Mönchengladbach Mavericks were an American football team from Mönchengladbach, Germany.

The club won promotion to the German Football League in 2010, and qualified for the semi finals of the play-offs the following year, its greatest success. Confronted with a debt of Euro 350,000, the club had its GFL licence withdrawn on 23 December 2011. The club's board consequently resigned and the Mavericks became defunct.

History
The Mönchengladbach Mavericks were formed in 1989. The Mavericks spent the first twenty years of their history in the local league system of North Rhine-Westphalia, never rising above the third tier.

The club's fortunes changed from 2007 onwards, when it introduced a new concept and new players, playing in the tier-four Oberliga NRW. After promotion from this league in 2008, the club also won the Regionalliga West in 2009, winning all ten league games, and overcame the Hamburg Blue Devils in two promotion games.

The Mavericks entered the German Football League 2, the second tier of the league system, for 2010. Achieving another unbeaten season in this league, the team was directly promoted to the GFL for 2011, the league having expanded from 12 to 14 teams.

The team followed up its 2010 success with an excellent 2011 season, finishing second in the GFL North and qualifying for the play-offs, where they were knocked out in the semi finals by Schwäbisch Hall Unicorns after defeating the Stuttgart Scorpions in the quarter finals.

Honours
 GFL
 League membership : 2011
 Play-off qualification : (1) 2011
 GFL2
 Northern Division champions: 2010

Recent seasons
Recent seasons of the club: 

 PR = Promotion round.
 RR = Relegation round.
 QF = Quarter finals.
 SF = Semi finals.
 GB = German Bowl

References

External links
  Official website
  German Football League official website
  Football History Historic American football tables from Germany

Defunct American football teams in Germany
German Football League teams
American football teams established in 1989
Sport in North Rhine-Westphalia
Sport in Mönchengladbach
1989 establishments in West Germany
American football teams disestablished in 2011
2011 disestablishments in Germany